The Trevett–Nunn House is a house located in northwest Portland, Oregon listed on the National Register of Historic Places.

See also
 National Register of Historic Places listings in Northwest Portland, Oregon

References

1891 establishments in Oregon
Colonial Revival architecture in Oregon
Houses completed in 1891
Houses on the National Register of Historic Places in Portland, Oregon
Northwest Portland, Oregon